Postojna Cave is a  long karst cave system near Postojna, southwestern Slovenia. It is the second-longest cave system in the country (following the Migovec System) as well as one of its top tourism sites. The caves were created by the Pivka River.

History
The cave was first described in the 17th century by the pioneer of study of karst phenomena, Johann Weikhard von Valvasor, although graffiti inside dated to 1213 indicates a much longer history of use. In 1818, when the cave was being prepared for a visit by Francis I, the first Emperor of the Austria-Hungary, a new area of the cave was discovered accidentally by Luka Čeč, a local man in charge of lighting lamps in the cave. In the 1850s, the Austrian-Czech geographer  Adolf Schmidl published the first comprehensive scientific overview of the Postojna caves and the Pivka Basin, which became a standard reference point in the study of speleology.

First tourist guide and electric lighting
In 1819, Archduke Ferdinand visited the caves, this is when the caves became officially known as a tourist destination. Čeč became the first official tourist guide for the caves when the caves were opened to the public. Electric lighting was added in 1884, preceding even Ljubljana, the capital of Carniola, of which the cave was part at the time, and further enhancing the cave system's popularity.

In 1872, cave rails were laid along with first cave train for tourists. At first, these were pushed along by the guides themselves, later at the beginning of the 20th century a gas locomotive was introduced.

During World War I, Russian prisoners of war were forced to construct a bridge across a large chasm inside the cave.

Mid-century changes
During World War II, German occupying forces used the cave to store nearly 1,000 barrels of aircraft fuel, which were destroyed in April 1944 by Slovene Partisans. The fire burned for seven days, destroying a large section of the cave and blackening the entrance.

After 1945, the gas locomotive was replaced by an electric one. About  of the cave system are open to the public.

At the end of the 1990s it was one of world's most visited show caves, with nearly 1 million tourists per year.

21st-century tourism
The cave also houses the world’s only underground post office.

Natural environment
Postojna Cave was carved by the Pivka River over millions of years. There are stalagmites, stalactites, and formations called curtains or draperies that look like folded curtains.

However, according to speleology rules, the passages and siphons connecting the caves must be walked or swum through by man for them to be considered one whole. Connecting two of the main cave systems will make this the longest cave system in Slovenia and one of the longest in all of Europe.

The caves are also home to the endemic olm, the largest troglodytic amphibian in the world. The tour through the caves includes an aquarium with some olms in it. On January 30, 2016, a female olm at the cave began to lay over 50 eggs. This rare event led to global news about Postojna Cave and the olm. From the end of May to mid-July 2016, twenty-two baby olms successfully hatched.

Postojna Cave tour
While the cave system is 24 km long, only 5 km is open to the public.  Of this, 3.5 km is traversed by a train that takes visitors through the cave; the remaining 1.5 km can be navigated on foot and with a guide. The whole tour takes about 1.5 hours.

The temperature inside the cave is around 10 Celsius.

Permanent exhibition
The exhibition "EXPO Postojna Cave Karst" was opened in April 2014. It is the largest permanent exhibition about the cave and karst phenomena around the world. The exhibition features interactive presentations about the history of the tourism-related development of the cave. Visitors learn about karst phenomena through projections of various material onto a three-dimensional model, discover the special features of the karst environment, and learn about historic events at Postojna Cave on the Wall of Fame. The exhibition is of interest to both the general public and experts. Children are interactively guided through the exhibition by an olm and a slenderneck beetle, and can ride a cave train by themselves.

Gallery

See also
List of caves in Slovenia
New Athos Cave in Georgia, also with its own railway

References

External links

 
Postojnska jama (Postojna cave). 360° Surround Photography. Burger.si

 
Tourist attractions in Slovenia
Show caves in Slovenia
Limestone caves
Postojna
Caves of Inner Carniola